Like Crazy (Mad Joy) is a 2016 Italian comedy-drama film directed by Paolo Virzì, starring Valeria Bruni Tedeschi and Micaela Ramazzotti. It tells the story of two women from different backgrounds who become friends while being treated at a mental institution. It was screened in the Directors' Fortnight section at the 2016 Cannes Film Festival.

Cast 
 Micaela Ramazzotti - Donatella Morelli
 Valeria Bruni Tedeschi - Beatrice Morandini Valdirana
 Valentina Carnelutti - Fiamma Zappa
 Marco Messeri - Floriano Morelli
  - Pierluigi Aitiani
  - Renato Corsi
 Anna Galiena - Luciana Brogi Morelli
 Tommaso Ragno - Giorgio Lorenzini
  - Torregiani
  - Signora Morandini Valdirana

Production
The film was produced by Lotus Production and Rai Cinema. It was shot in Tuscany and Rome. Filming began on 18 May 2015 and lasted eight weeks.

Release
01 Distribution released the film in Italy on 18 May 2016.

The film's first English-speaking audience release took place in Australia on November 24, 2016 through Hi Gloss Entertainment. The film had previously played at the New Zealand Film Festival, and at the Italian Film Festival in Australia. The film was previewed to mental health professionals to generate interest and discussions on themes in the film. At present the film is rated 82% on the website Rotten Tomatoes.

Awards

References

External links 
 

2016 films
Films directed by Paolo Virzì
Films shot in Rome
Films shot in Tuscany
2010s Italian-language films
Films about psychiatry
Films set in Tuscany
Italian road comedy-drama films
2010s road comedy-drama films